Northern Crossing may refer to:

Northern Crossing (shopping mall), a shopping mall in Glendale, Arizona
Northern Crossing (Tararua Range), a tramping/hiking track in New Zealand